Dun v. Lumbermen's Credit Ass'n, 209 U.S. 20 (1908), was a United States Supreme Court case in which the Court held the existence of some copyright-infringing information in a rote reference work does not entitle the original author to seek an injunction against the printing the later article when the later article's contents demonstrate significant original work.

References

External links
 

1908 in United States case law
United States copyright case law
United States Supreme Court cases
United States Supreme Court cases of the Fuller Court